During the 1947–48 English football season, Everton F.C. competed in the Football League First Division.

League table

Results

Football League First Division

FA Cup

Squad

References

Everton F.C. seasons
Everton